The 1951 Bari Grand Prix was a non-championship Formula One motor race held on 2 September 1951 at the Lungomare Circuit, in Bari, Italy. The 65-lap race was won by Alfa Romeo driver Juan Manuel Fangio. Fangio also set pole position and fastest lap. Ferrari drivers José Froilán González and Piero Taruffi finished second and third.

Results

References

Bari Grand Prix
Bari